Plomelin (Ploveilh in Breton) is a commune in the Finistère department of Brittany in north-western France.

International relations

Population
Inhabitants of Plomelin are called in French Plomelinois.

Breton language
The municipality launched a linguistic plan concerning the Breton language through Ya d'ar brezhoneg on 3 July 2008.

See also
Communes of the Finistère department
Buckwheat whisky, produced in Plomelin by Distillerie des Menhirs.

References

External links
Official website 

Mayors of Finistère Association 

Communes of Finistère